Hermann Cohen (also known as Augustine Mary of the Blessed Sacrament, O.C.D., better known as Father Hermann; 10 November 1820 – 20 January 1871) was a noted German Jewish pianist,  who converted to the Catholic Church. He later became a friar and priest of the Discalced Carmelite Order, who was instrumental in re-establishing his Order in both France and England. He was a popular preacher throughout Europe, and was instrumental in introducing the widespread practice of nocturnal adoration of the Blessed Sacrament.

The cause for Cohen's canonization has been accepted for investigation by the Holy See.

Life

Early life and musical career
He was born in Hamburg, one of the four children of David Abraham Cohen and Rosalie Benjamin, part of a large and prosperous Jewish banking family. Although not pious, his parents were members of the Reform Judaism movement there and taught their son Hebrew and the basics of the Jewish faith.

A gifted student, at the age of 4 he began to study the piano, at which he soon became accomplished. Praised by his teacher, who had arranged successful concerts for him at the age of 7 in Altona and Frankfurt, he became the spoiled focus of the family's attention. From his teacher, he also acquired a serious gambling habit, which was to plague him for many years. At the age of 12, his mother resolved to take him to Paris to advance his musical training, against the wishes of her husband, who was experiencing financial difficulties. Undeterred, she approached the Grand Dukes George of Mecklenburg-Strelitz and Francis I of Mecklenburg-Schwerin, in order to obtain their financial support for her son. Successful in her quest, she took her children and moved to Paris. The family arrived there in July 1834, only to learn that, as a foreigner, Hermann was denied admission to the famed Paris Conservatory.

Franz Liszt
This rejection led to a significant direction in Cohen's life. Rosalie Cohen was able to persuade the renowned pianist Franz Liszt to take her son on as a pupil. Despite his early reluctance, after hearing him play and taken by his good looks, Liszt accepted him as a pupil. Cohen soon became his favorite student. As Liszt himself had been nicknamed Putzig (German for "little cute guy") by his own teacher, Carl Czerny, he began to call Cohen Puzzi, a diminutive form of the word. Liszt accepted Cohen into his social circle, introducing him to his friends, the author George Sand and the radical priest, the Abbé de Lamennais, who both also became charmed by the boy. Sand began to dote on the boy and called him Le Mélancolique Puzzi. Lamennais gave the young Jewish boy an autographed copy of his work, Paroles d'un croyant—for which the priest had just been excommunicated by Pope Gregory XVI—with the inscription: Souvenirs offerts à mon cher petit Puzzi.

The following June, Liszt left Paris without warning with his new lover, the Countess Marie d'Agoult, and moved to Geneva, where he began to teach at the recently founded Geneva Conservatory of Music. Devastated by the sudden loss of his mentor, Cohen persisted in begging Liszt to allow him to join him there, to which Liszt eventually relented. Cohen's arrival in the Liszt circle in Geneva soon earned him the long-held enmity of the countess. His abilities continued to grow under Liszt's watchful eye. On 1 October 1835 Cohen played in a concert sponsored by the Princess Cristina Trivulzio Belgiojoso. Together with Liszt and two other pianists, he played in a four-piano Brilliant Potpourri on folk airs by Czerny. That same month Liszt entrusted the boy with 10 students of his own. At age 13, Cohen's career appeared headed for greatness.

By then Cohen had become Liszt's constant companion, accompanying him and the countess on their holiday trips through the Swiss countryside. He was with them and Sand on a notorious trip to Chamonix. He later wrote, Circumstances led me into the interior of a family unsanctified by the marriage ties. As dissolute as the circle appeared to the world, Liszt felt himself responsible for the boy's moral as well as his professional development and Cohen was touched when Liszt gave him a Bible. Cohen felt a deep religious experience in the course of one trip, when Liszt played an improvisation of the Dies Irae from Mozart's Requiem on the Grand Organ of the Cathedral of St. Nicholas in Fribourg.

In 1837 Liszt and his circle returned to Paris, where the princess had arranged for a famed competition between him and his greatest rival of the period, Sigismond Thalberg. She came to know Cohen at that time and became a friend and patron. When his increasing debts threatened to drown him, she arranged for a concert, which was to prove unsuccessful, apparently due to his lack of training from the idle lifestyle of gambling and dissolution he had adopted. The shock of this failure led Cohen to return to Hamburg, where he sought help from his father. Alone and in financial straits himself, the elder Cohen had no interest in helping his son. Cohen then turned to a former patron, Grand Duke George of Mecklenburg-Strelitz, who sponsored several concerts for him to raise funds. They were successful enough to allow him to return to Paris. There he met a popular Italian singer named Mario, which whom he formed a partnership. The duo traveled to London, where Cohen improved his skills and experienced a number of successes with their concerts.

Again saddled with debts, by 1839 Cohen began to be estranged from his mentors, both Liszt and the princess, as a result of his lifestyle. The Countess d'Agoult used an affair he had with a married woman in her campaign in an attempt to discredit him in Liszt's eyes, who nonetheless kept Cohen as his companion for his concert tours around Europe until the end of 1840. His ties to Liszt were not without their own consequences. Friedrich Wieck, father of the future Clara Schumann, began to criticize publicly both Liszt and Cohen in the newspapers in Leipzig. He was furious at Liszt for supporting Robert Schumann in his own lawsuit against Wieck: "To show cause why his twenty-year-old daughter Clara should not marry Schumann". Liszt shrugged off the charges but Cohen did not and took Wieck to court, where he won his case.

The year 1841 saw a final rupture between Cohen and Liszt, when the teenager was accused of embezzling funds from some concerts Liszt had given in Dresden. He was unable to persuade Liszt of his innocence. He felt his life had been wrecked, later calling this experience the result of "a plot hatched in hell". He spent the next five years traveling around Europe with his mother and his sister Henriette, playing concerts and composing works for the piano.

Conversion
Cohen settled in Paris in October 1846, where he shared an apartment with an artist friend. The following spring he met and fell in love with a popular circus rider, Celeste Mogadar, with whom he shared a deep love of music. The relationship soon ended, however, when he broke it off abruptly, indicating that he felt called to place his life in the hands of God.
Disgusted with his life, he began to seek spiritual guidance, visiting churches of the city, where he would spend hours in prayer.

In May 1847, while playing the organ for a Benediction service in the former Church of St. Valerius, he became overwhelmed by an intense experience of submission, which he again experienced at the same service the next day, at which time the thought came to him that he should become a Catholic. While he was in Ems, Germany, to give a concert, he was again overwhelmed during the services in a local church there and resolved to take this step.

Cohen had never known a priest besides Lamennais and was confused as to in whom he could confide. He was introduced to Marie Theodor Ratisbonne, a fellow Jewish convert, who, in turn introduced him to the Abbé Legrande. Under his instruction, Cohen was trained in the Catholic faith and was baptized, with the baptismal name of Marie-Augustin-Henri, on 28 August, the feast day of his namesake, St. Augustine. The baptism took place in the Chapel of Our Lady of Zion, in the presence of Ratisbonne, its founder, and many Jewish Catholics. At his baptism, he experienced an apparition of Christ, the Blessed Virgin Mary, and a multitude of saints, all bathed in a brilliant light, as well as an overwhelming experience of love.

Cohen received Confirmation the following 3 December from the Archbishop of Paris, Denis Auguste Affre. With the support of Jean-Baptiste de Bouillé, the Archbishop of Poitiers, out of his own experience, he immediately began efforts to popularize the practice of the nocturnal adoration of the Blessed Sacrament by the general faithful.

Cohen soon felt called to be a priest. He first approached the Benedictine monks of the Abbey of Solesmes, who were known for their studies for the revival of Gregorian chant. They declined his application. Next he turned to Jean-Baptiste Henri Lacordaire, O.P., who was in the process of re-establishing the Dominican Order in France, after its destruction during the French Revolution. He counseled Cohen to find an Order more monastic than the Dominicans. Cohen then explored the more austere branch of the Carmelite Order, the Discalced, (or Barefoot) Carmelites, who follow the reforms of the Spanish mystics, John of the Cross and Teresa of Ávila, who was also of Jewish ancestry. He felt called to this Order, with its claim to having originated on Mount Carmel in Palestine, under the Prophet Elijah. Being a recent convert was a barrier to his admission, however, due to Church law, which required a personal visit to Rome to obtain a dispensation.

Discalced Carmelite friar
Cohen gave a farewell concert which cleared his debts, required before he could be admitted to the Order, in the days before the Revolution of 1848. Instead of joining the fight in the streets, he was at his favorite devotion, spending the night in adoration before the exposed Blessed Sacrament. He entered the Discalced Carmelite novitiate at Le Broussey, in Rions, France, on 19 July of that year. He received the religious habit on 6 October 1849, being given the religious name of Augustine Mary of the Blessed Sacrament. He professed religious vows as a member of the Order on 7 October 1850. He then began to study theology. In this he faced a major challenge, as his formal education had stopped at the age of ten. Having been granted an exemption from some of the required courses, he was ordained a priest on 19 April 1851.

Once ordained, Cohen launched himself into a ministry of preaching, which was to lead him to all the capitals of Europe. He preached to thousands in Geneva, Bordeaux, Lyon, and in Paris before huge crowds in prominent churches, such as Saint-Sulpice and Sainte-Clotilde. The poet, Charles Baudelaire, wrote that he found Cohen's sermons fascinating. His fiery eloquence and the interest caused by his conversion made him a popular preacher, despite his limited studies. He became a main figure in the restoration of the Carmelites in France, taking an active role in the founding of several priories of friars in the south of France: Bagnères-de-Bigorre (1853), Lyon (1857) and a hermitage in Tarasteix, near Lourdes (1857).

Reconciliation
By 1852, Cohen and Liszt, who was known for his generosity of spirit, had renewed their association through correspondence. Cohen invited his former mentor to visit him in France, which Liszt, by then living in Weimar, was unable to do. Several years later, Liszt's daughter with the countess reported to her father that her mother had undergone a change of heart and had come to admire Cohen. Liszt returned the offer in 1857, pleading illness for not being able to travel.

In June 1862, both Cohen and Liszt happened to be in Rome. By this time, Liszt was himself a cleric, being in minor orders and a Franciscan tertiary. They met for the first time in years, spending three weeks together, playing music and walking in the Colosseum. By that time, his mother, Maria Anna Liszt, had ceased to view Cohen with the antisemitism she had exhibited all her life prior to that.

Mission to England
Cohen's fame as a preacher led to an invitation by Cardinal Wiseman to come to England to re-establish the Carmelite Order, after its suppression in the Dissolution of the Monasteries in the 16th century, for which he received a special blessing from Pope Pius IX. He arrived in London in 1862, having £7 (c. £550 in modern funds) to support his work. He opened the new priory with a public religious procession, the first held by English Catholics since the time of the Tudors. He gained further public attention to his ministry in 1864, when he faced a jeering crowd while administering the Last Rites to six Catholic sailors about to  be hanged on the gallows of Newgate Prison. He was lauded for his bravery by The Times of London.

Final days
In 1867 Cohen retired to the hermitage he had founded in Tarasteix, France. During this period, his eyesight began to fail and he was diagnosed with glaucoma. Spurning the surgery prescribed by his doctors, he chose to make a pilgrimage to the Shrine of Our Lady of Lourdes. Bathing his eyes there from the miraculous spring attributed to the shrine, his sight was immediately restored. He then returned to his life of solitude in France fully cured, living there in peace for the next few years.

Cohen's life was uprooted, however, by the outbreak of the Franco-Prussian War in 1870, when all German nationals were expelled from France. Even though he was exempted by the French government, and his surviving immediate family were living in France, he chose to go into exile in Geneva, Switzerland that following October. He soon heard of the large numbers of French prisoners being held in Spandau Prison, just outside Berlin at that time. Despite his failing health, he volunteered to minister to them, and moved to Berlin in November. He found a facility crammed with over 5,000 prisoners living in squalid conditions, of whom some ten percent were suffering from serious infectious diseases, including smallpox.

As the prison chaplain, Cohen worked tirelessly to alleviate the needs of the French prisoners, distributing relief supplies in addition to his spiritual services. He said daily Mass, regularly drawing 500 attendees, and heard frequent Confessions. He administered the Last Rites to two prisoners with his own hands instead of the prescribed spatula. Within two months, he began to exhibit the symptoms of smallpox himself, dying on 19 January 1871. His remains were buried in St. Hedwig's Cathedral in Berlin. After the destruction of the church during World War II his remains were transferred to the cathedral cemetery. In 2008 his remains were exhumed and transferred to the priory in Le Broussey where he had entered the Carmelite Order.

Works of Augustin-Marie 
 Le Catholicisme en Angleterre, a speech delivered at Mechlin, also in English (Paris, 1864)
 Gloire à Marie (1849)
 Amour à Jésus (1851)
 His musical setting for the Holy Mass (1856)
 Fleurs du Carmel (1870)
 Couronnement de la Madonne (1870)
 Thabor (1870), five collections of sacred songs with accompaniment

External links 
Tierney, Tadgh O.C.D. The Story of Hermann Cohen, OCD: from Franz Liszt to John of the Cross. Oxford: Teresian Press.
Rosalie Marie Levy, ed. Why Jews Become Catholics. New York: published by the author, 1924.
Ronda Chervin, ed. Bread From Heaven: stories of Jews who found the Messiah. New Hope, KY: Remnant of Israel, 1994.
Stéphane-Marie Morgain, Le Père Hermann Cohen (1820-1871) - Un romantique au Carmel, Parole et Silence, 2019.

References 

1820 births
1871 deaths
Musicians from Hamburg
19th-century German Jews
German classical pianists
Male classical pianists
Jewish classical pianists
Franz Liszt
Converts to Roman Catholicism from Judaism
Discalced Carmelites
19th-century German Roman Catholic priests
German chaplains
Deaths from smallpox
Burials at St. Hedwig's Cathedral
Burials in Nouvelle-Aquitaine
19th-century venerated Christians
19th-century German composers
19th-century classical pianists
19th-century male musicians
19th-century musicians